Events from the year 1443 in Ireland.

Incumbent
Lord: Henry VI

Births

Deaths
 Giolla na Naomh Mac Aodhagáin, Irish scribe and historian